Turkey took part in the Eurovision Song Contest 1982. The country was represented by Neco with the song "Hani?" written by Faik Tuğsuz and composed by Olcayto Ahmet Tuğsuz. The entry was chosen by a professional jury.

Before Eurovision

6. Eurovision Şarkı Yarışması Türkiye Finali 
The final took place on 7 March 1982 at the TRT Studios in Ankara, hosted by Canan Kumbasar. Six songs were to compete but "Müzikle Yaşam" performed by Şenay withdrew from the competition. Instead five songs competed and the winner was determined by an expert jury.

At Eurovision
On the night of the contest Neco performed 5th in the running order following United Kingdom and preceding Finland. At the close of the voting Hani had received 20 points placing Turkey 15th. 6 participants had voted for Hani. The Turkish jury awarded its 12 points to Germany.

The Turkish jury included Mine Ant, Jale Özkasım, Fariz Acar, Hakan Şerafettinoğlu, Haluk Günuğur, Taner Acar, Muammer Tosun, Sezer Öktem, Gülsen Nas, Dilek Abışgil and Belma Eşiyok.

Voting

References 

1982
Countries in the Eurovision Song Contest 1982
Eurovision